Bresson may refer to:

 Robert Bresson (1901–1999), French film director
 Henri Cartier-Bresson (1908–2004), French photographer
 Bresson, Isère, a town in France